The England A Team Triangular Series in 2014 was a List A cricket tournament that was held in England in August 2014 between the teams England Lions, New Zealand A and Sri Lanka A. New Zealand A emerged victorious of the tournament.

Squads

Points table

Fixtures

Group stage

Round 1

Round 2

See also
Australia A Team Quadrangular Series in 2014

References

External links
 

International cricket competitions in 2014
One Day International cricket competitions